Río de Jesús District is a district (distrito) of Veraguas Province in Panama. The population according to the 2000 census was 5,256; the latest official estimate (for 2019) is 5,501. The district covers a total area of 302 km2. The capital lies at the town of Río de Jesús.

Administrative divisions
Río de Jesús District is divided administratively into the following corregimientos:

La Ermita de Río de Jesús
Catorce de Noviembre
Las Huacas
Los Castillos
Utira
Nuevo San Juan (created in 2012)

References

Districts of Panama
Veraguas Province